1999 Census may refer to:

Azerbaijan Census (1999)
Belarus Census (1999)
France Census (1999)
French Guiana Census (1999)
Kazakhstan Census (1999)
Kyrgyzstan Census (1999)
Kenya Census (1999)
Solomon Islands Census (1999)
Vietnam Census (1999)